Gold is a surname. Notable people with the surname include:

 Adam Gold (disambiguation), multiple people
Adam Golde, politician
Adam Gold (radio presenter) on WPTK
Adam Gold (musician) of The Mendoza Line (band)
 Alan Gold (disambiguation), multiple people
Alan Gold (author) (born 1945), author, literary critic and human rights activist
Alan B. Gold (1917–2005), chief justice of the Quebec Superior Court
Alan Stephen Gold (born 1944), American lawyer and judge
 Alison Gold (b. 2002), American pop singer
 Andrew Gold (1951–2011), American singer-songwriter
 Ari Gold (disambiguation), multiple people
 Ari Gold (Entourage), character in the HBO comedy Entourage
 Ari Gold (musician) (1974-2021), R&B artist
 Ari Gold (album), eponymous album, released 2001
 Ari Gold (filmmaker), filmmaker, actor, musician
 Arielle Gold (born 1996), American Olympic bronze medalist and world champion snowboarder
 Bela Gold (1915–2012), Hungarian-born American businessman and professor
 Ben-Zion Gold (1923-2016), Polish-American rabbi
 Bill Gold (1921–2018), American graphic designer
 Bonnie Gold (b. 1948), American mathematician
 Brian and Tony Gold, Jamaican dance hall duo
 Charles Gold (disambiguation), multiple people
 Charles Gold (British Army officer) (d. 1842), British artillery officer, fought at Waterloo for 2nd Infantry Division (United Kingdom)
 Charles Emilius Gold (1809–1871), New Zealand soldier and artist, son of the above
 Sir Charles Gold (MP) (1837–1923), Liberal Member of Parliament for Saffron Walden
Daisy Hendley Gold (1893–1975), American author and journalist
 Dave Gold (1932–2013), founder of 99 Cents Only chain
 David Gold (disambiguation), multiple people
 David Gold (1980–2011), frontman of the band Woods of Ypres
 David Gold, Baron Gold (born 1951), British lawyer and Conservative life peer in the House of Lords
 David Gold (bridge), English bridge player
 David Gold (businessman) (born 1936), English businessman
 David Gold (footballer) (born 1993), Scottish footballer
 David Gold (talk radio host), American conservative talk radio host
 Dore Gold (born 1953), Israeli diplomat
 Edgar Gold (born 1934),  Australian-Canadian lawyer, author, academic, and Master Mariner
 Edward Gold (born 1936), American composer
 Eli Gold (born 1953), American sportscaster
 Elon Gold (born 1970), American comedian, actor, writer and producer; brother of Ari Gold
 Emanuel R. Gold (1935–2013), New York politician
 Ernest Gold (disambiguation), multiple people
 Ernest Gold (meteorologist) (1881–1976), British meteorologist
 Ernest Gold (composer) (1921–1999), American composer
 Gary Pig Gold (born 1955), Canadian singer-songwriter, record producer, filmmaker and author
 Gracie Gold (born 1995), American figure skater
 Glen David Gold (born 1954), American author
Hadas Gold (born 1988), American media and business reporter 
 Harry Gold (disambiguation), multiple people
 Harry Gold (musician) (1907–2005), British dixieland jazz saxophonist and bandleader
 Harry Gold (EastEnders), soap opera character
 Harvey Gold (born 1952), American guitarist, bassist, and organist
 Henry Gold (disambiguation), multiple people
 Henry Golde (1929-2019), Polish author
 Henry Gold Danforth (1854–1918), American politician
 Henry Gold (photographer) (born c. 1934), Australian photographer
 Herbert Gold (born 1924), American novelist
 H. L. Gold (Horace Leonard Gold, 1914–1996), American SF writer and editor
 Ian Gold (born 1978), American football linebacker
 Jack Gold (1930–2015), British film and television director
 Jacqueline Gold (b. 1960), British businesswoman
 Jake Gold (born 1958), Canadian music manager
 Jamie Gold (born 1969), winner of the 2006 World Series of Poker Main Event
 Jared Gold (born 1972), American fashion designer
 Jim Gold (born 1947), musician
 Joe Gold (1922–2004), American bodybuilder and entrepreneur
 Joe Dan Gold (1942–2011), American college basketball player and coach
 Jonathan Gold (1960–2018), Pulitzer Prize–winning food critic
 Joseph Gold (disambiguation), multiple people
 Joseph Gold (lawyer) (1912–2000), international law scholar and official of the International Monetary Fund
 Joseph Gold, chemist who proposed the medical use of hydrazine sulfate in 1970s
 Judy Gold (born 1962), American comedian and actress
 Julie Gold, American singer-songwriter
 Kathe Gold (1907–1997), Austrian actress
 Kristi Gold, American romance novelist
 LauraMaery Gold, American non-fiction writer
 Lauren Gold (born 1980), British model
 Lee Gold, California SF fandom notable
 Lex Gold (born 1940), football administrator
 Lloyd Gold (born 1950), American television soap opera writer and playwright
 Louise Gold (born 1956), British singer, actress and puppeteer
 Marian Gold (born 1954), German singer
 Mark Gold (disambiguation), multiple people
 Mark S. Gold, American medical researcher
 E. Mark Gold, American physicist, mathematician and computer scientist
 Mark Gold, a character in the film 17 Again
 Mary Jayne Gold (1909–1997), American heiress
 Marty Gold (born 1915), American composer, pianist, and bandleader
 Max Gold, Austrian soccer player
 Mike Gold (1893–1967), American literary critic
 Missy Gold (born 1970), American child actress
 Morton J. Gold (1917–2013), United States Air Force general
 Murray Gold (born 1969), English composer and dramatist
 Nathan Gold (1663–1723), American colonial leader and deputy governor
 Robin Gold, International Commissioner of the Scout Association
 Phil Gold (born 1936), Canadian physician, scientist, and professor
 Pleasant Daniel Gold (1833–1920), American publisher and clergyman
 Sam Gold (director)
 Samuel Gold, composer of chess problems
 Sharon Anderson-Gold, chair at the Science and Technology Studies Department at Rensselaer Polytechnic Institute
Simone Gold, American anti-vaccine activist, founder of America's Frontline Doctors
 Stanley Gold, American business manager
 Tanya Gold (born 1973), British journalist
 Taylor Gold (born 1993), American Olympian snowboarder
 Ted Gold (1947–1970), radical Columbia University student leader
 Theodore Sedgwick Gold (1818–1906), American politician and farmer
 Thomas Gold (disambiguation), multiple people
 Thomas Gold (1920–2004), Austrian-born astrophysicist
 Thomas R. Gold (1764–1827), United States Representative from New York
 Thomas Gold (DJ) (born 1981), German DJ and producer
 Tom Gold (dancer), ballet dancer
 Tom Gold (rally driver), English rally driver
 Tracey Gold (born 1969), American actress
 Victor Gold (disambiguation), multiple people
 Victor Gold (chemist) (1922–1985), British chemist
 Victor Gold (journalist) (1928–2017), American journalist, author and Republican political consultant
 Victor J. Gold, dean of Loyola Law School
 Walter Kelvington Gold (1847–1895), South Australian painter
William Gold (born 1996), known online as Wilbur Soot, British musician and internet personality 
 Xaviera Gold, African American dance music singer

Fictional
Rumplestiltskin, also known as Mr. Gold, character from the ABC television series Once Upon a Time

See also 
 Gould (name)
 Gold (disambiguation)

English-language surnames
Jewish surnames
Yiddish-language surnames